Egil Johan Østenstad (born 2 January 1972) is a Norwegian former professional footballer who played as a forward. 

He started and ended his career at Viking, before going on to play in the Premier League for Southampton, Blackburn Rovers and Manchester City. In 2003 he made a move to the Scottish Premier League with Rangers before finishing his career back with Viking in 2005. He was capped 18 times by Norway, scoring 6 goals.

Following his retirement he was appointed director of football at Viking and remained in the position until stepping down in 2011.

Club career

Viking FK
Born in Haugesund, Østenstad started his career with local club Torvastad IL. He arrived at Viking in 1990, and helped the club to win the Norwegian Premier League title in 1991, when he featured in 10 out of the 22 league games. He played a total of 280 games for the club, scoring 88 goals, before moving to Southampton in the FA Premier League in October 1996.

Southampton
Østenstad was signed by manager Graeme Souness for £800,000 on 3 October 1996 and made his debut at Coventry City on 13 October 1996. In only his third game for the Saints he opened his goal-scoring account in spectacular fashion with a hat-trick in the 6–3 win against Manchester United on 26 October 1996. Subsequently, the Dubious Goals Committee credited his third goal to an own goal by Phil Neville, who touched the ball last in a vain attempt to prevent it from crossing the goal-line, although Østenstad retained the match ball.

In his first season at The Dell he led the line well linking up superbly with Matthew Le Tissier and Eyal Berkovic scoring nine goals from 30 league appearances and was voted the Fans' player of the season. During the 1997 close season, Østenstad was a transfer target for Liverpool and Newcastle United, but Østenstad remained at The Dell as neither club was willing to match Southampton's £7 million asking price.

By the start of the following season, Souness had departed to be replaced by Dave Jones from Stockport County. Unfortunately, Eyal Berkovic also departed thus breaking up what had looked like becoming a successful partnership. Østenstad was now paired with Kevin Davies in attack but failed to score until a substitute appearance against West Ham United on 4 October 1997. Following the signing of David Hirst he was dropped from the team, making only the occasional substitute appearance. After coming off the bench to score in a 3–2 victory over Liverpool on 7 February 1998, he started the remaining 13 league games, scoring eight goals as the Saints finished the 1997–98 season in 11th place.

Østenstad was part of the Norway squad for the 1998 World Cup held in France, but was given little chance to make any impact.

In the 1998 close season, Kevin Davies departed for Blackburn Rovers, with James Beattie joining the Saints as part of the deal. Østenstad was now paired up front with veteran striker Mark Hughes. The 1998–99 season saw Saints struggle to score goals and they were never out of the relegation zone until the last two weeks of the season. Despite only scoring seven goals, Østenstad was Saints top goal-scorer for the season (jointly with Matthew Le Tissier), but by the end of the season he had lost his starting place in the team to Marians Pahars.

Østenstad started the 1999–00 season brightly, scoring the only goal at Coventry City in the opening game on 7 August 1999. 11 days later, Dave Jones decided to move him on and arranged an exchange deal with Blackburn Rovers with Kevin Davies returning to The Dell. This move saw him drop down a division, as Rovers had just been relegated to Division One.

In his three years at the Saints, Østenstad scored 28 goals in 96 league appearances, plus a further five goals in 13 cup games. He was always a popular figure, but sometimes infuriated fans by seeming to miss as many "easy" goals as he scored difficult ones.

Blackburn Rovers
Despite being re-united with manager Graeme Souness and dropping down a division, Østenstad struggled to make an impact at Ewood Park. He started well, scoring a brace in his second game, in a 2–0 victory at Norwich City on 28 August 1999 and completed the 1999–00 season with eight league goals from 28 appearances, playing alongside Ashley Ward and Lee Carsley.

The goals then started to dry up and the following season he only made 13 appearances for Blackburn with three goals. By now, Blackburn were relying on goals from Matt Jansen and David Dunn to see them to promotion. He spent the end of the 2000–01 season on loan at Manchester City (where he made four appearances with no goals).

In the 2001–02 season Østenstad only made four appearances in the Premier League. Rovers won the 2001–02 Football League Cup and despite being left out of the squad for the final, Østenstad did appear in some of the earlier rounds. In the following season, he appeared more regularly and, despite only one league goal in 17 appearances, he did score in a UEFA Cup game against CSKA Sofia.

In his four seasons at Blackburn, he made a total of 62 league appearances scoring 12 goals.

Rangers
Østenstad signed for Rangers on a free transfer by Alex McLeish in the summer of 2003. However, he made next to no impact during a very unproductive spell and wound up having his contract terminated before the end of the season. His only two goals at Rangers came in the League Cup in games against Forfar Athletic and St Johnstone.

Return to Viking
After his disappointing season at Rangers, he made a long-awaited return to Viking midway through the 2004 season.

He was an instant hit at his old club, scoring 3 goals in 9 games to help save the club from relegation. Although he continued to be a regular starter and a prolific goalscorer, Østenstad retired at the end of the 2005 season. An internet petition for him to stay on for another season collected close to 2500 signatures.

International career
Østenstad made his debut for the Norwegian national team in 1993, coming on as a substitute to score twice against the Faroe Islands. He was capped 17 times between 1993 and 1999, mostly as a substitute, and he played in the 1998 World Cup in France. Østenstad scored 6 times for Norway, making him the most efficient marksman in the history of the Norwegian national team with one goal in every 94 minutes played. On 7 September 2005, more than six years after his last appearance, he made his comeback with the national team, starting in the 1–2 defeat to Scotland.

Career outside football
Østenstad retired after the 2005 season. He was the director of football for Viking, until he stepped down on 8 June 2011. Østenstad was also the inspiration for the character "Yngve" in the book Mannen som elsket Yngve (The Man Who Loved Yngve) by Tore Renberg. The author and Østenstad went to the same high-school.

Career statistics

1 - includes FA Cup, Scottish Cup and Norwegian Football Cup.

2 - includes Football League Cup and Scottish League Cup.

References

Bibliography

External links

1972 births
Living people
People from Haugesund
Norwegian footballers
Norway international footballers
Viking FK players
Southampton F.C. players
Blackburn Rovers F.C. players
Manchester City F.C. players
Rangers F.C. players
1998 FIFA World Cup players
Premier League players
Scottish Premier League players
Eliteserien players
Expatriate footballers in England
Expatriate footballers in Scotland
Norwegian expatriate footballers
Viking FK non-playing staff
Association football forwards
Norwegian expatriate sportspeople in England
Norwegian expatriate sportspeople in Scotland
Sportspeople from Rogaland